Aaron Christian Howles (born June 3, 1993) is an American television actor and singer known for his roles on Swingtown, True Blood and United States of Tara.

Howles began acting at age 11 when he appeared in a community production of Winnie the Pooh. He then performed in a national tour of Oliver!.

Music
Howles is active in a number of music projects.
	 	
In June 2010, Howles joined new group Protect the Mona Lisa as guitarist and singer. Aidan Gould synthesized, Tyler Lampman played drums and Stefan Edwards played bass. They are described as an alternative/progressive rock/indie band.
	 
Since the beginning of 2012, he has been a member of Smoking Sons, along with Evan Gamble and Drew Matthews. Their debut album is called PISTOL PINK, which they perform selections from in the Los Angeles area. The band has been described as a rock/thrash band.
	 	
Howles stated "The way I see it is, acting is the way I want to be able to pay for the things that I want to do musically. Because music is definitely my passion, and it’s sort of where my heart lies. But acting seems like it will give me a secure future, as long as I keep plugging away at it."

Filmography

External links

References

People from Houston
Living people
1993 births
American male television actors